Ukraine: A Concise Encyclopaedia is a Ukrainian English-language encyclopaedia in 2 volumes. The encyclopaedia  was published in Toronto (Canada) by Toronto University Press and the Ukrainian National Association in  1969. It was prepared by the Shevchenko Scientific Society, the editor-in-chief was Volodymyr Kubiyovych.

Content 
Ukraine: A Concise Encyclopaedia is an English translation of the thematic part of the Entsyklopediia ukrainoznavstva (which was originally published in 1949). It was revised, and supplemented with up-to-date material by a number of research scholars from the US and Canada.

The encyclopaedia consists of:

 Volume 1 — 1186 pages
 Volume 2 — 1394 pages

Volume 1 covers Ukrainian subjects including: history, demography, geography, language, and literature.

Volume 2 covers Ukrainian subjects including: law and jurisprudence, churches, scholarship and education, libraries, archives, museums, architecture, sculpture, painting, graphic arts, music choreography, theater, cinema, publishing, media, economy, health and medicine, armed forces, and the Ukrainian diaspora.

A new revised and expanded English-language edition of the great ten-volume alphabetic part was published under the title Encyclopedia of Ukraine in Canada in the 1980s and 1990s, and was only completed after Kubiyovych's death. It is presently being put on-line.

See also 

 Encyclopedia of Ukraine
 Encyclopedia of Modern Ukraine
 Ukrainian Soviet Encyclopedia

References

External links. 
 Ukraine: A Concise Encyclopedia (Books Google)

Canadian encyclopedias
English-language encyclopedias
Ukrainian studies
Ukrainian-language encyclopedias
20th-century encyclopedias
21st-century encyclopedias
National encyclopedias
Ukrainian-language books
University of Toronto Press books